American Society for Testing and Materials et al. v. Public.Resource.Org is a United States court case concerning copyright of published building codes and fire codes and public access to the same. In 2013, Public.Resource.Org was sued by the American Society for Testing and Materials, the National Fire Protection Association, and the American Society of Heating, Refrigerating and Air Conditioning Engineers for scanning and making available building codes and fire codes which these organizations consider their copyrighted property.  The case was heard in the District Court of the District of Columbia, with Judge Tanya S. Chutkan presiding. Chutkan ruled against Public.Resource.Org and ordered Malamud to delete all the standards from the Internet. Public.Resource.Org appealed the case to the D.C. Circuit. In 2018, the D.C. Circuit reversed and remanded the decision, holding that the fair use doctrines had been improperly applied. In March 2022 Chutkan issued an opinion that would allow Public.Resource.Org to reproduce 184 standards under fair use, partially reproduce 1 standard, and deny reproduction of 32 standards that were found to differ in substantive ways from those incorporated by law. ASTM et al. appealed the case to the D.C. Circuit. Final briefs are due February 2023.

Support for Public.Resource.Org
A number of library and public interest associations weighed in supporting the position of Public.Resource.Org. These organizations include American Association of Law Libraries, Electronic Frontier Foundation, Library Futures, Reporters Committee for Freedom of the Press, and Public Citizen.

References

External links
https://law.justia.com/cases/federal/appellate-courts/cadc/17-7035/17-7035-2018-07-17.html

Public.Resource.Org
United States Court of Appeals for the District of Columbia Circuit cases
2023 in United States case law